Vem is a 1999 studio album by Swedish dansband Grönwalls.

Track listing
Vem
Stoppa klockan
I varje andetag
Hooked on a Feeling
Min tanke är hos dig
Glöm ej ta mig med
Anna och mej (Me and Bobby McGee)
Be mig stanna kvar
Nånstans i det blå
Min kärlek är du
Ju mer jag ser dig
En natt med dig
Ett tomt och öde hus
Då kan jag lova dig kärlek
Never Again, Again

Charts

References 

1999 albums
Grönwalls albums